Poleramma Jatara is celebrated with grandeur. Though Kalivelamma is the village goddess, Poleramma Jatara, which is the custom of Rajas, became very famous. It's celebrated every year by Venkatagiri citizens. Also large numbers of people will turn up for this occasion from nearby villages and nearer cities like Nellore, Tirupati, Sri Kalahasti and Chennai as well.

History 

It's believed that this festival has a long time ago during the time of Venkatagiri rajas in the mid-18th century local people believed that the goddess herself came and used to talk with the rajas during the time of festival. It is usually held every year on 3rd Wednesday and Thursday after Vinkayaka Chaturthi.

References
http://1nellore.com/4888/poleramma-jathara-in-venkatagiri-of-nellore-district/

Festivals in Andhra Pradesh
Nellore district